Archibald McBryde (September 28, 1766February 15, 1837) was a Congressional Representative from North Carolina.

He was born in Wigtownshire, Scotland, immigrated at an early age with his parents, and settled in Carbonton, North Carolina.

McBryde studied under private teachers and later studied law.  He was admitted to the bar and served as clerk of the superior court of Moore County 1792–1816.  McBryde was elected as a Federalist to the Eleventh and Twelfth Congresses (March 4, 1809 – March 3, 1813) and as a member of the North Carolina General Assembly in 1813 and 1814.

After office, McBryde resumed his law practice until he died in 1837 in Carbonton and was interred in Farrar Cemetery. McBryde's death date is often given as February 1836. However, records from the NC Supreme Court indicate he was alive in September 1836. An 1841 statement written by McBryde's wife supports a February 1837 death date, as well.

References 
 U.S. Congress Biographical Directory entry

North Carolina state senators
1766 births
1837 deaths
Federalist Party members of the United States House of Representatives from North Carolina